The initialism SJCC may refer to:

Education 
 San Jose City College, a community college in San Jose, California, U.S.
 Southwest Junior College Conference, a junior college athletics conference in the U.S.
 Spring Joint Computer Conference, a U.S. computer conference from 1962–1973
 St Joseph College of Communication, a media college in Changanassery, India
 St. Joseph's College of Commerce, a Jesuit college in Bangalore, India

Organizations 
 San Jose Chamber of Commerce in San Jose, California, United States